The Motettenchor Pforzheim is a German mixed choir of some 60 to 70 people, dedicated mostly to Baroque music. It is based at the Evangelische Stadtkirche in Pforzheim. Founded by Rolf Schweizer in 1966, as of 2015 it is led by Kord Michaelis, the State Kantor of Mittelbaden. The choir has garnered acclaim for its a cappella concerts and recordings, notably the works of J. S. Bach, Heinrich Schütz and Max Reger.

References

German choirs
Johann Sebastian Bach
Pforzheim